Tsering Wangyal (March 6, 1949 - November 24, 2000) simply known as “Editor”, was the editor of the Tibetan Review for 20 years.

Early life 
Tsering Wangyal was born on March 6, 1949. He studied history at the University of Bristol, England.

Career 
In 1970, after completing his studies, he came back from England and served in the Tibetan government in exile in Dharamshala, India.

Mr Wangyal was appointed the editor of the Tibetan Review in 1976 after Dawa Norbu left to pursue his further studies to University of California, Berkeley in the United States.

He remained the editor of Tibetan Review until his resignation in September 1996 and left for Canada. He was succeeded by Mr Pema Thinley, who is the present editor of the Tibetan Review.

He has also contributed his writings to various magazine and books.

The Editor 
Tsering Wangyal was known for his wit and humour and his editorial. He has written against the Tibetan government's ineffectiveness and Chinese government attacks on Tibet.

Fellowship 
Mr Wangyal went to USA from May to December 1986 to pursue an internship which was offered by the Alfred Friendly Press Fellowship and it was hosted by the Quincy Patriot Ledger. At this interim Mr Lhasang Tsering managed as the Acting Editor of the Tibetan Review.

Death 
Tsering Wangyal passed away at a very young age of 51 due to Hepatitis B illness on November 24, 2000 in Toronto, Canada.

References 

1949 births
2000 deaths
British editors
Alumni of the University of Bristol
Tibetan writers
Tibetan emigrants to the United Kingdom
Tibetan emigrants to India
20th-century Tibetan people